is a passenger railway station in the city of Midori, Gunma, Japan, operated by the third sector railway company Watarase Keikoku Railway.

Lines

Station layout
The station has a two opposed side platforms, and one bay platform which is used as the starting point of the seasonal open car tourist trains departing for the Watarase Gorge.

Adjacent stations

History
It was renamed to its present name on 1 December 1912. The station building and platform were registered by the national government as a national Tangible Cultural Property in 2008.

Surrounding area
 former Ōmama Town Hall
 Ōmama Post Office

See also
 List of railway stations in Japan

References

External links

   Station information (Watarase Keikoku) 

Railway stations in Gunma Prefecture
Railway stations in Japan opened in 1911
Midori, Gunma
Registered Tangible Cultural Properties